The (First) Battle of Buzenval was part of the siege of Paris during the Franco-Prussian War. The besieged troops in Paris, under the orders of General Louis Trochu, made a sortie in the direction of Versailles.

Purpose 

Under orders of the governor of Paris, a sortie was made by General Auguste-Alexandre Ducrot in the direction of Rueil with the objective of taking the hamlets of Malmaison, Jonchère, and Buzenval, defended by the 3rd Division of the 5th Prussian Corps, a fraction of the 4th Corps, and a regiment of the Guard Corps.

Composition 

The attacking troops were organized into three groups plus reserves:
   
 The first group, commanded by General Henri Berthaut, had 3,400 infantry, 20 cannons, and a squadron of cavalry to run between the St. Germain railway and upper Rueil.
 The second group, commanded by General Noël, had 1,350 infantry and 10 cannons to operate in the south coast of Malmaison Park and the ravine descending from the woods of St. Cucufa in Bougival. Under orders of the governor of Paris, a sortie was made by General Ducrot in the direction of Rueil with the objective of taking the hamlets of Malmaison, Jonchère, and Buzenval, defended by the 3rd division of the 5th Prussian corps, a fraction of the 4th corps, and a regiment of the guard.
 The third group, commanded by Colonel Cholletou, had 1,600 infantry, 18 cannons, and a cavalry squadron to take a forward position in the old mill above Rueil, and to link and support the left and right columns.
 Two reserve forces were arranged.
 One on the left, under orders of General Martenot, with 2,600 infantry and 18 cannons.
 One in the center, commanded by General Paturel, with 2,000 infantry, 28 cannons, and 2 cavalry squadrons.

The battle
At 1:00 pm, the French military opened fire down the line, concentrating for 45 minutes on Buzenval, Malmaison, Jonchere, and Bougival. In the meantime, the skirmishers and the heads of the French column were approaching their objectives:
 Malmaison to the column Berthaut and Nuel 
 Buzenval to the column Cholletou
After the cannonade, the troops marched to the assigned objectives and arrived at the ravine descending from the woods of Saint-Cucufa to the American railroad, bypassing the Malmaison. The left column of General Noel passed the ravine and climbed the slopes that rise to Jonchere, but they soon were halted by under heavy musket fire leaving the woods from the houses, where the Prussians waited to ambush them. At the same time, 4 companies led by Zouaves, under orders of Commander Jacquot, were caught in the corner that forms the Park of Malmaison below the Jonchere, they were able to disengage because of the intervention from the battalion of Seine-et-Marne mobile. This battalion was carried on the slopes above St. Cucufa was its night supported the park of the malmaison, and opened fire on the Prussians who were forced to retreat, thus allowing the 4 companies of Zouavas to enter the park.

Meanwhile, the snipers of the second division (commanded by Captain Favre-Biguet of the Cholletou column) rushed to Buzenval, entered it, and advanced, under the cover of the woods to the border of the Saint-Cucufa forest.

Around 5:00 pm, the night arrived and the fire ceased everywhere, General Ducrot commanded troops to return to their barracks.

In the main, the column of General Martenot was a diversion on the left. A battalion settled on the farm of Fouilleuse, and skirmishers pushed up the ridges, even for a moment holding the redoubt Montretout and heights of Garches. On the right, the 6th Dragoon Regiment, supported by a cavalry battery, was carried in the direction of the Seine between Argenteuil Bezons and fired cannons upon some Prussian positions.

Defense of the gate of Longboyau 
During the sortie, the batteries of Commander Miribel, particularly the 4th battery of Captain Nismes, who was positioned close to the gate of Longboyau, were surprised by Prussian elements. The incident, known as Defense of the gate of Longboyau, consisted of the French and Prussians fighting at close range through the bars of the gate. During the fighting, the French lost the commander of the support company, 10 cannoniers, and 15 horses.

Losses 
General losses of the French for 21 October 1870 were as follows:
 Officers: 2 dead, 15 wounded, and 11 missing.
 Soldiers: 30 dead, 230 wounded, and 153 missing.
 Total: 443

German losses are unknown.

See also
 Battle of Buzenval (1871)

External links 
 

Battles of the Franco-Prussian War
Buzenval 1870
History of Hauts-de-Seine
1870 in France
October 1870 events